Kuseh Safar (also Romanized as Kūseh Şafar) is a village in Sarajuy-ye Jonubi Rural District, Saraju District, Maragheh County, East Azerbaijan Province, Iran. At the 2006 census, its population was 96, in 24 families.

References 

Towns and villages in Maragheh County